AFC Asian Cup songs and anthems are songs and tunes adopted officially to be used as warm-ups to the event, to accompany the championships during the event and as a souvenir reminder of the events as well as for advertising campaigns leading for the Asian Cup, giving the singers exceptional universal world coverage and notoriety. However, Asian Cup only started to practice using official songs since 21st century, started in 2004 edition, 

Most of the songs representing each Asian Cup tournaments are mainly in English even it can be also multilingual, while some native languages are also used for the song. The official versions also results in cover versions in many other languages by the original artist or by local artists.

Unlike some continental football tournaments such as Copa América or UEFA European Championship, several songs in the Asian Cup might not be official but popular voted and listened, de facto make it official song.

Official songs and anthems

Entrance music

See also
 List of FIFA World Cup songs and anthems
 List of UEFA European Championship songs and anthems
 List of Copa América songs and anthems
 List of Africa Cup of Nations songs and anthems

References